Korafe is a Papuan language spoken in Oro Province, in the "tail" of Papua New Guinea. It is part of the Binanderean family of the Trans–New Guinea phylum of languages. Korafe or could also be called Kailikaili, Kaire, Korafe, Korafi, Korape, and Kwarafe is a language spoken in the Oro Province more specifically in the Tufi District, and Cape Nelson Headlands. 

Korafe has been heavily influenced by Oceanic languages.

Speakers 
For the people that lived of the Korafe language lived with three main principles:

 Self-sustaining economy
 Responsibilities and such go beyond one generation and can be passed down to one's children and so on and so forth
 Belief in magic powers as well as a [[spirit world]] that are involved in a good well being for the community

The Korafe people are a people that live in a mainly tribal manner as they wear very outlandish headgear as well as many other types of jewelry not commonly found anywhere else. The people were rich in culture and that can be seen within the complexity in the Korafe Language.

Phonology

Consonants

Stress 

 Stress on syllables comes on different syllables depending on the amount of syllables
 The accent mark also helps to show the location of said syllable that is being stressed
 The first syllable is stressed when the word itself has 2 syllables
 Example: gháka ‘canoe’   jáinjain ‘chirp of a cricket’
 The second syllable is stressed when the word itself has more than 2 syllables
 Example: genémbo ‘man’, gegénembo ‘men’ , tatárigho ‘echo’, ufóngufongu ‘iguana’
 Also the first syllable is stressed when it uses the syllable pattern

Orthography

Grammar 

The Korafe language has primarily SOV or Subject-Object-Verb word order. An example of the use of Subject-Object-Verb word order is shown below:

ere-gov-ena

REP-plant.vs1-PRES.1S.FN

‘I am planting’

Pronouns

Interrogatives

Stems and Verbs 
For stem verbs I the structure of that verb would be said root word followed by -e, -i, or -u.

Example:

Stem II verbs are normally somewhat close to Stem I verbs but with a few changes whether it be a vowel shift, reduplication etc. Normally, removes one of the vowels which are most likely -u, or -i

Example:

Verbs follow serial verb construction, or basically using more than 1 verb next to each other in a clause.

Example:

'while I will be speaking'                                'he wrote'

Non-Finite Verb Forms

Positive Deverbals 
When creating a positive deverbal it is a root word followed by the suffix -ari.

Example:

'to speak/speaking'          'to cook/cooking'                 'to write/writing'

Negative Deverbals 
Negative versions of Positive Deverbals are the same structurally but just has a different suffix which for negatives is -ae

Example:

'not saying'           'not cooking'          'not writing'

Verb Formation 
In Korafe only one heavy syllable is allowed (vv in the Rhyme)

Almost all imperfective verbs will use the -ere rules

-ere replacement rules 

 When the verb is a stem II verb and also follows any of the following order V, CV, VCV, CVCV, VNCV, CVNCV, then the -ere will be put right before the stem word

Example:

'be writing'                   'be binding'             'be butchering'

2. Verb is stem two but have longer configurations such as VCVCV, CVCVCV, VNCVCV, CYNCVCV. In this case the -ere rule applies by having the root word followed by -ere.

Example:

'be entering'                                 be nurturing'

Nominal and Verb Combinations 
Some phrases and expressions can be made with the use nominals and verbs together.

The Epenthetic Insertion Rules 
The epenthetic rules are used in order to avoid changing the meaning of words that would be changed from suffixes.

Epenthetic r-insertion (imperfective) 
For r-insertion it is normally used between the stem II verb and the -uru

Example:

'be writing while'

r-Insertion for one syllable (Ci or Cu stems) 
For this case an r is inserted between the stem II verb and the suffix -arira (will)

Example:

barija di-arira -->  barija di-r-arira,                                     Not --> d-arira

rainfall rain-F.3S.FN --> rainfall rain-EPEN-F.3S.FN 

'it will rain'

Nouns

Noun Phrases

References 

 Farr, C. J. (1998). The interface between syntax and discourse in Korafe, a Papuan language of Papua New Guinea. Canberra: Pacific Linguistics, Research School of Pacific and Asian Studies, Australian National University.
 The Sounds and Colors of a Papua New Guinean Sing-sing – Wild Junket Adventure Travel Blog. (2015, August 21). Retrieved from https://www.wildjunket.com/papua-new-guinea-sing-sing/

External links 
 
 Korafe-Yegha Swadesh List
 

Languages of Oro Province
Greater Binanderean languages